Griffeth-Pendley House is a historic property that includes a log dogtrot home, barn and shed in Jasper, Georgia.  It was built by Caleb "Cale" Griffeth III who inherited the 110-acre property from his father Caleb Griffeth II in 1877. It was listed on the National Register of Historic Places on April 16, 2008. It is located at 2198 Cove Road.

See also

National Register of Historic Places listings in Pickens County, Georgia

References

Houses completed in 1877
Houses on the National Register of Historic Places in Georgia (U.S. state)
Houses in Pickens County, Georgia
Dogtrot architecture in Georgia (U.S. state)
National Register of Historic Places in Pickens County, Georgia
1877 establishments in Georgia (U.S. state)